Lakonta is an unincorporated community in Mahaska County, in the U.S. state of Iowa.

History
Lakonta was platted in 1900. The name Lakonta is of Native American origin meaning "blacksmith". A post office was established as Lakonta in 1900, renamed Truax in 1926, and the post office closed in 1934.

Lakonta's population was 21 in 1915.

References

Unincorporated communities in Mahaska County, Iowa
1900 establishments in Iowa
Unincorporated communities in Iowa